Silver Birches may refer to:

in Canada
Silver Birches (Salvation Army Camp), in Newfoundland, near Corner Brook

in the United States
Silver Birches (hotel), Hawley, Pennsylvania, one of the Historic Hotels of America

See also
Betula pendula, the silver birch tree